The European Women's Basketball League, shortly EWBL, formerly known as Eastern European Women's Basketball League or EEWBL, is a top-level professional regional basketball league, featuring female clubs from EWBL members (Belarus, Czech Republic, Estonia, Hungary, Kazakhstan, Latvia, Lebanon, Lithuania, Netherlands, Poland, Russia, Slovakia, Sweden, Ukraine, Turkey).

History
The competition was founded in 2015 under the name , as a women's regional tournament for Eastern European countries. As the competition expanded to countries outside Eastern Europe, it was re-named  ahead of the 2018–19 season.

Expansion
Since the inaugural season, the league have the following changes to the number of teams and the countries participating.
 2015–16 - 8 teams from 6 countries (Belarus, Estonia, Kazakhstan, Latvia, Lithuania, and Poland). 
 2016–17 - 12 teams from 9 countries (Belarus, Kazakhstan, Latvia, Lithuania, Poland, Russia, Slovakia, Ukraine and Turkey).
 2017–18 - 16 teams from 10 countries (Belarus, Kazakhstan, Latvia, Lebanon, Lithuania, Netherlands, Russia, Slovakia, Sweden and Turkey).
 2018–19 - 16 teams from 10 countries (Belarus, Czech Republic, Hungary, Kazakhstan, Latvia, Lithuania, Netherlands, Russia, Slovakia and Sweden).

Format
The league has a regular season followed by a final four. The regular season is divided in three stages, each stage is played at a different location and each team play more than one opponent per stage. That reduces the clubs financial travel and accommodation costs for clubs (compared to traditional home and away league format). The best teams of the regular season qualify for the final four stage.

Summary

List of champions

MVP by edition
 2015–16 -  Kristen Mann
 2016–17 -  Zuzana Žirková
 2017–18 -  Zuzana Žirková

References

External links
 Official website
 Profile at eurobasket.com

Eastern European Women's Basketball League
Sports leagues established in 2015
2015 establishments in Europe